Roberto Carlos a 300 Quilômetros por Hora is a  Brazilian film first released in December 1971, directed and produced by Roberto Farias,  and written by Bráulio Pedroso.The film had an audience of 2.785.922 spectators, being the highest-grossing Brazilian film of 1971.

Synopsis 
Lalo (Roberto Carlos), a mechanic in a car dealer joins an auto racing team when his boss, the main driver, suffers an accident and becomes traumatized of racing.

Main cast 
 Roberto Carlos	 ... 	Lalo	
 Erasmo Carlos	 ... 	Pedro Navalha	
 Raul Cortez	 ... 	Rodolfo Lara
 Mário Benvenutti	 ... 	Alfredo	
 Libânia Almeida	 ... 	Luciana (as Libânia)	
 Cristina Martinez	 ... 	Neuza	
 Flávio Migliaccio	 ... 	Luigi	
 Otelo Zeloni	 ... 	Mané	
 Reginaldo Faria	 ... 	Playboy	
 Walter Forster

References

External links 

Brazilian adventure films
Films directed by Roberto Farias
1970s Portuguese-language films
Brazilian auto racing films
1971 films
1970s adventure films